The Haryanka dynasty was the third ruling dynasty of Magadha, an empire of ancient India, which succeeded the Pradyota dynasty and Barhadratha dynasty. Initially, the capital was Rajagriha. Later, it was shifted to Pataliputra, near the present-day Patna in India during the reign of Udayin. Bimbisara is considered as the main founder of the dynasty.

According to the Buddhist text, the Mahavamsa, Bimbisara was appointed king by his father, Bhattiya, at the age of fifteen.

This dynasty was succeeded by the Shishunaga dynasty.

Governance
The governance structure of Haryanka dynasty is mentioned in ancient texts. They mention gramakas (village headmen) who headed village assemblies and mahamatras (high-ranking officials) who had executive, judicial and military functions.

Historically, this period coincided with the Achaemenid conquest of the Indus Valley during the rule of Darius I from about 517/516 BCE.

Rulers

Bimbisara

Bimbisara reigned from 545 to 493 BCE. The extent of his kingdom is mentioned in Mahavagga. His advisors included Sona Kolivisa, Sumana (flower gatherer), Koliya (minister), Kumbhaghosaka (treasurer) and Jīvaka (physician). He was given the title of Seniya.

Both Jain and Buddhist texts claim the king was a follower of their 
respective religions. Uttaradhyayana Sutra says he was a follower of Mahavira, whereas Sutta Nipata depicts him and his wife, Khema, as followers of Buddha. The latter further mentions he deputed Jīvaka to assist Buddha's Sangha. He also married Chellana and Kosala Devi, sister of Pasenadi.

According to George Turnour and N.L. Dey, the name of the father of Bimbisara was Bhatiya or Bhattiya, but the Puranas refer him as Hemajit, Kshemajit, Kshetroja or Ksetrauja and the Tibetan texts mention him as Mahapadma.

Ajatashatru

Ajatashatru reigned from 493 to 462 BCE. He married Vajira, Kosala's princess.

In some sources, Bimbisara was imprisoned and killed by his son and successor, Ajatashatru, under whose rule the dynasty reached its largest extent. Ajatashatru was contemporary with Mahavira (599–527 BCE) and Gautama Buddha (563–483 BCE). Ajatashatru fought a war against the Vajjika League, ruled by the Lichhavis, and conquered them.

Udayin

Udayin or Udayabhadra is mentioned in Buddhist and Jain texts as the successor of Ajatashatru . Puranas however mention him as the fourth king after Darshaka.

Later rulers
Puranas mention Nandivardhana and Mahanandin as successors of Udayin. According to Buddhist tradition, Anurudhha, Munda and Nagadarshaka were his successors.

List of Rulers

Bimbisara (544–492 BCE)
Ajatashatru (492–460 BCE)
Udayin (460–444 BCE)
Anuruddha (444–440 BCE)
Munda (440–437 BCE)
Nāgadāsaka (437–413 BCE)

Decline
Haryanka dynasty was ultimately overthrown out of power by their Amatya (minister), Shishunaga.

See also
 Magadha-Vajji war
 Pradyota dynasty
 Avanti-Magadhan Wars

References

Citations

Sources

 
 

 
History of Bihar
Kingdoms of Bihar
States and territories established in the 6th century BC
6th-century BC establishments in India
5th-century BC disestablishments in India
5th century BC in India